The women's singles competition began on 9 October 2010. and finished on 13 October 2010.

Results

Qualifying – round robin

Section A

Section B

Finals

See also
Lawn bowls at the 2010 Commonwealth Games

References

Lawn bowls at the 2010 Commonwealth Games
Comm